"Drops of Jupiter", initially released as "Drops of Jupiter (Tell Me)", is a song written and recorded by American rock band Train. It was released on January 29, 2001, as the lead single from their second studio album, Drops of Jupiter (2001). The song hit the top five of the Billboard Hot 100 chart and also charted in the top 40 for 29 weeks. The European single has tracks "It's Love", "This Is Not Your Life", and "Sharks" as its B-sides.

The recording features the signature strings of arranger Paul Buckmaster, who won the 2001 Grammy Award for Best Instrumental Arrangement Accompanying Vocalist(s) for "Drops of Jupiter."

Background and composition
Lead singer Pat Monahan stated that the song was inspired by his late mother, who had died after a struggle with cancer, and that the opening lines "came to [him] in a dream". He told VH1's Behind the Music: "The process of creation wasn't easy. I just couldn't figure out what to write, but then I woke up from a dream about a year after my mother passed away with the words 'back in the atmosphere'...It was just her way of saying what it was like – she was swimming through the planets and came to me with drops of Jupiter in her hair."

The song is written in the key of C major and plays at a moderate tempo in cut time.

Critical reception
Chuck Taylor of Billboard magazine reviewed the song favorably, saying that it "demonstrates a truly artistic lyrical bent that merits instant acceptance of this credible rock-edged song". He sums up the review saying "add piano, a splendid orchestral backdrop, and a vocal shimmering with passion and personality, and this is a runaway track for Train".

Chart performance
"Drops of Jupiter" peaked at number five on the US Billboard Hot 100 in June 2001. On the Billboard Adult Contemporary chart, the song ascended to the top 10 during its 49th week, marking the longest climb to the top 10 on that tally by any act, and spent 54 weeks on the ranking. The song has sold and streamed over 6,000,000 units since its digital release in 2003, earning a six-times platinum certification from the Recording Industry Association of America (RIAA).

On the UK Singles Chart, "Drops of Jupiter" debuted and peaked at number 10 on August 5, 2001. The track re-entered the UK Singles Chart for the week ending on April 7, 2012, at number 53 following a performance from contestant Phil Poole on The Voice UK. On the week ending April 28, 2012, "Drops of Jupiter" climbed to number 34. The song has received a double platinum certification from the British Phonographic Industry (BPI) for sales and streams exceeding 1,200,000 units.

Music video
There are two music videos for this song. The first one shows the band performing it on a stage, with a large banner reading "TRAIN" in the green-lit background. Clips of a woman performing various actions in various backgrounds related to the lyrics (e.g., Jupiter, holding her hands out in the rain) are inserted into various parts of the song.

The second, more famous video shows the band performing the song on a stage backed by a string ensemble. As the video progresses, people come in to watch the song being performed. The video was shot at Union Station in Los Angeles, California, and was directed by Nigel Dick with art direction by Andrew Elias. It was released in July. The first version of this particular video also featured the story of a girl who ran away from home and, upon arriving at the station where the band was playing, was so moved that she decided to return home. However, this storyline was dropped during the editing process.

Awards
The song was nominated for five Grammy Awards, including Song of the Year, Record of the Year and Best Rock Performance by a Duo or Group with Vocal, and won two for Best Rock Song and Best Instrumental Arrangement Accompanying Vocalist(s).

Track listings

US 7-inch single
A. "Drops of Jupiter (Tell Me)" – 4:20
B. "Meet Virginia" – 4:00

UK CD single
 "Drops of Jupiter (Tell Me)" – 4:20
 "It's Love" – 4:22
 "This Is Not Your Life" – 5:02
 "Drops of Jupiter (Tell Me)" (video version)

UK cassette single
 "Drops of Jupiter (Tell Me)" – 4:20
 "This Is Not Your Life" – 5:02

European CD single
 "Drops of Jupiter (Tell Me)" – 4:20
 "It's Love" – 4:22

Australian CD single
 "Drops of Jupiter (Tell Me)" – 4:20
 "It's Love" – 4:22
 "This Is Not Your Life" – 5:02
 "Sharks" – 3:29

Credits and personnel
Credits are lifted from the Drops of Jupiter album booklet.

Studios
 Recorded and mixed at Southern Tracks Recording (Atlanta, Georgia, US)
 Strings recorded at Capitol Studios (Hollywood, California)
 Mastered at Gateway Mastering & DVD (Portland, Maine, US)

Personnel

 Train – writing
 Charlie Colin – background vocals, guitars, bass
 Rob Hotchkiss – background vocals, guitars, bass
 Pat Monahan – vocals, percussion
 Jimmy Stafford – background vocals, guitars
 Scott Underwood – keyboards, drums, percussion, programming
 Chuck Leavell – piano
 Brendan O'Brien – keyboards, production, mixing
 Mike Markman – principal violin
 Evan Wilson – principal viola
 Dan Smith – principal cello
 Suzie Katayama – cello, orchestral contracting
 Paul Buckmaster – orchestral arrangement and conducting
 Steve Churchyard – orchestral engineering
 Steve Genewick – orchestral engineering assistance
 Nick DiDia – recording
 Bob Ludwig – mastering

Charts

Weekly charts

Year-end charts

All-time charts

Certifications

Release history

References

External links
 Lyrics of Taylor Swift cover from Speak Now: World Tour Live

2001 singles
2001 songs
Columbia Records singles
Fiction set on Jupiter
Grammy Award for Best Instrumental Arrangement Accompanying Vocalist(s)
Grammy Award for Best Rock Song
Irish Singles Chart number-one singles
Song recordings produced by Brendan O'Brien (record producer)
Commemoration songs
Songs written by Pat Monahan
Train (band) songs